Dark Angel is a DC Comics supervillain who battled Wonder Woman. She is a wandering spirit who inhabited the body of Baroness Paula Von Gunther during World War II. Recently it was revealed that Dark Angel was, in fact, the Donna Troy of the pre-Crisis Earth-Seven, saved from certain death by the Anti-Monitor. 

The character first appeared in Wonder Woman vol. 2 #131 (March 1998).

Fictional character biography
The bringer of doom known as Dark Angel has long bedevilled humans foolish enough to summon her. During World War II, Baroness Paula Von Gunther, (pre-Crisis, a brilliant Nazi saboteur who eventually became one of Wonder Woman's staunchest allies, who became post-Crisis a Nazi occult mistress), called forth this wandering evil spirit, who then took over Von Gunther's body and attacked Wonder Woman and the Justice Society with her mythic might.

Hippolyta battled Dark Angel on many occasions, and eventually Dark Angel appeared on Themyscira. She intended to kidnap Princess Diana, but instead kidnapped her magical double. She forced the double (who she thought was Diana) to live thousands of lifetimes, each one ending in tragedy. She hoped the cumulative effect would drive Hippolyta insane. Instead, the double was able to grow stronger, and finally became an independent entity now known as Donna Troy.

Donna Troy was able to defeat Dark Angel, and at some point Dark Angel separated herself from von Gunther. The Baroness was last seen living among the Amazons.

Return of Donna Troy

In the Return of Donna Troy mini-series, Donna Troy discovered that Dark Angel was in fact her counterpart from Earth-Seven and was saved from the burning apartment by the Anti-Monitor, who raised her to serve him much as the Monitor had saved and raised Harbinger. When the Multiverse was reconfigured in one single Universe, Dark Angel, who had somehow escaped the compression of every Donna Troy into one single person in the new Earth, sought to kill Donna and make her relive the lives of the other alternate Donnas as a way to avoid the merging and remain the last one standing. When Dark Angel was defeated, Donna became the real sum of every Donna Troy that existed on every Earth, a living key to the lost Multiverse.

One Year Later
The continuity-altering effects of 52 and Infinite Crisis resulted in a new multiverse. A new Dark Angel has appeared, although it is not yet known if she is a multiversal counterpart to Donna Troy or if she has a different origin altogether, although a comment from the character in Countdown to Adventure #4 implies she is at least partially both versions. She commented: "I have survived all manner of crises and served Monitor and Anti-Monitor alike". 

A year after the events of Infinite Crisis, Dark Angel appeared as the servant of the 52 new Monitors, each born from the creation of a new Multiverse. She tested Supergirl to see if she was indeed the proper persona to exist in the current DC Universe. After the test Dark Angel told Supergirl that it was her job to prod and provoke questionable entities or anomalies, in order to ensure their veracity in the world. Believing Supergirl to be out of place in the timestream Dark Angel was about to erase Supergirl's existence but was stopped by one of the 52 Monitors before she could do so and was reassigned to another unknown task. This task is later revealed to be the destruction of the entirety of Earth-48, the Forerunner home planet.

She later pursues Donna Troy, Kyle Rayner and Jason Todd through the Multiverse (possibly at the Monitors' behest), inquiring to the denizens of the Wildstorm Universe (Earth-50) as to whether her lookalike had passed through. Dark Angel then appears in Countdown to Adventure #3, disguised as an Oracle on Earth-33, turning the conjurers against Forerunner when she arrives. She then sheds her disguise and attacks Forerunner, killing the Earth-33 version of Starman before she is defeated. She escapes before Forerunner can finish her.

Powers and abilities
Dark Angel is an incredibly powerful sorceress, able to cast various magic spells, transverse through space-time, and be nearly immortal.

See also
 List of Wonder Woman enemies

References

Comics characters introduced in 1998 
DC Comics characters who are shapeshifters
DC Comics characters who can teleport 
DC Comics characters who have mental powers
DC Comics characters who use magic
DC Comics female supervillains
DC Comics undead characters
Fictional characters who can change size
Fictional characters who can manipulate time
Fictional characters with spirit possession or body swapping abilities 
Fictional characters with immortality
Fictional ghosts
Wonder Woman characters
Characters created by John Byrne (comics)